Sychr's catfish (Corydoras sychri) is a tropical freshwater fish belonging to the Corydoradinae sub-family of the family Callichthyidae.  It originates in inland waters in South America, and is found in the Nanay River basin in Loreto, Peru.

The fish grows up to 1.7 inches (4.3 cm).  It lives in a tropical climate in water with a 6–8 pH, a water hardness of 2–25 dGH, and a temperature range of 72–79 °F (22–26 °C).  It feeds on worms, benthic crustaceans, insects, and plant matter.  It lays eggs in dense vegetation and adults do not guard the eggs.  The female holds 2–4 eggs between her pelvic fins, where the male fertilizes them for about 30 seconds.  Only then does the female swim to a suitable spot, where she attaches the very sticky eggs. The pair repeats this process until about 100 eggs have been fertilized and attached.

See also
List of freshwater aquarium fish species

References

 

Corydoras
Freshwater fish of Peru
Taxa named by Stanley Howard Weitzman
Fish described in 1960